Arnaldo Dante Momigliano (5 September 1908 – 1 September 1987) was an Italian historian of classical antiquity, known for his work in historiography, and characterised by Donald Kagan as "the world's leading student of the writing of history in the ancient world".

Biography
Momigliano was born on 5 September 1908 in Caraglio, Piedmont. In 1936 he became Professor of Roman History at the University of Turin, but as a Jew soon lost his position due to the anti-Jewish Racial Laws enacted by the Fascist regime in 1938, and moved to England, where he remained. After a time at Oxford University, he taught Ancient History at the University of Bristol where he was made a lecturer in 1947. He went to University College London, elected Chair of Ancient History from 1951 to 1975. He was a Fellow of the Warburg Institute and supervised the PhD of Wolf Liebeschuetz. Momigliano visited regularly at the University of Chicago where he was named Alexander White Professor in the Humanities, and at the Scuola Normale Superiore di Pisa. He wrote reviews for The New York Review of Books. In addition to studying the ancient Greek historians and their methods, he also took an interest in modern historians, such as Edward Gibbon, and wrote a number of studies of them.

After 1930, Momigliano contributed a number of biographies to the Enciclopedia Italiana; in the 1940s and 1950s he contributed biographies to the Oxford Classical Dictionary and Encyclopædia Britannica. In his retirement, he was made a distinguished visiting professor for life at the University of Chicago and held fellowships at All Souls College, Oxford and Peterhouse, Cambridge. He was elected to the American Philosophical Society in 1969 and the American Academy of Arts and Sciences in 1971. In 1974 he was made an honorary Knight Commander of the Order of the British Empire (KBE).

Momigliano died in London on 1 September 1987. A number of his essays were collected into volumes published posthumously; the University of Bristol also established an academic prize in his name, to be awarded to undergraduate students of exceptional historical ability.

Views
In the 1930s, Momigliano joined the National Fascist Party, swore loyalty to Benito Mussolini, and sought exemption from antisemitic Italian racial laws as a party member. Momigliano believed that several classical works of European literature had contributed to the nationalism and warfare in Europe, and considered works such as Germania and the Iliad as "among the most dangerous books ever written". Momigliano considered it wasteful and "comical" to spend much efforts at identifying and explaining the forces held responsible for the gradual disintegration of the Roman Empire. In the 1980s, Momigliano and fellow historian Carlo Ginzburg leveled heavy criticism against French philologist Georges Dumézil, whom they charged with being a fascist opposed to "Judeo-Christian" society. Momigliano's attacks on Dumézil, who was then in very poor health, have been described as "unfair and vicious" by Edgar C. Polomé.

Works
 George Grote and the Study of Greek History, London: Lewis, 1952.
 The Conflict Between Paganism and Christianity in the Fourth Century, Clarendon Press, 1963
 Studies in Historiography, Garland Pub., 1985, 
 The Development of Greek Biography: Four Lectures, Harvard University Press, 1971; revised and expanded, Harvard University Press, 1993, 
 Alien Wisdom: The Limits of Hellenization, Cambridge University Press, 1975; reprint, Cambridge University Press, 1978, 1990, 1991, 1993 
 Essays in Ancient and Modern Historiography, Wesleyan University Press, 1977, 
 "History and Biography" and "Greek Culture and the Jews", in The Legacy of Greece, a new Appraisal, Moses I Finley (ed.), Clarendon Press, Oxford, 1981
 How to Reconcile Greeks and Trojans, North-Holland Pub. Co., 1982
 "Premesse per una discussione su Georges Dumézil", Opus 2 (1983): 329–42.
 English translation: "Introduction to a Discussion of Georges Dumezil", in Studies on Modern Scholarship (see below), pp. 286–301.
 "Georges Dumézil and the Trifunctional Approach to Roman Civilization", History and Theory 23, no. 3 (1984): 312–20.
 "Two Types of Universal History: The Cases of E. A. Freeman and Max Weber," The Journal of Modern History Vol. 58, No. 1, March 1986
 On Pagans, Jews and Christians, reprint, Wesleyan University Press, 1987, 
 The Classical Foundations of Modern Historiography, University of California Press, 1990, 
 Essays on Ancient and Modern Judaism, Editor Silvia Berti, University of Chicago Press, 1994; 
 
 "The Rules of the Game in the Study of Ancient History", History and Theory 55, no. 1 (February 2016).

References

Sources

Further reading
 Bowersock, G. W. "Momigliano's Quest for the Person", History and Theory, Vol. 30, No. 4, Beiheft 30: The Presence of the Historian: Essays in Memory of Arnaldo Momigliano. (Dec. 1991), pp. 27–36.
 
 Christ, Karl. "Arnaldo Momigliano and the History of Historiography", History and Theory, Vol. 30, No. 4, Beiheft 30: The Presence of the Historian: Essays in Memory of Arnaldo Momigliano. (Dec. 1991), pp. 5–12.
 Ginzburg, Carlo. "Momigliano and de Martino", History and Theory, Vol. 30, No. 4, Beiheft 30: The Presence of the Historian: Essays in Memory of Arnaldo Momigliano. (Dec. 1991), pp. 37–48.
 Gould, Rebecca Ruth. "Antiquarianism as Genealogy: Arnaldo Momigliano’s Method", History & Theory Vol. 53 No. 2 (2014), pp. 212–233. 
 Kagan, Donald, "Arnaldo Momigliano and the human sources of history", The New Criterion, Vol. 10, No. 7, March 1992.
 Murray, Oswyn. "Arnaldo Momigliano, 1908–1987: [Obituary]", The Journal of Roman Studies, Vol. 77. (1987), pp. xi–xii.
 Murray, Oswyn. "Arnaldo Momigliano in England", History and Theory, Vol. 30, No. 4, Beiheft 30: The Presence of the Historian: Essays in Memory of Arnaldo Momigliano. (Dec. 1991), pp. 49–64.
 Phillips, Mark Salber. "Reconsiderations on History and Antiquarianism: Arnaldo Momigliano and the Historiography of Eighteenth-Century Britain", Journal of the History of Ideas, Vol. 57, No. 2. (Apr. 1996), pp. 297–316.
 Weinberg, Joanna. "Where Three Civilizations Meet", History and Theory, Vol. 30, No. 4, Beiheft 30: The Presence of the Historian: Essays in Memory of Arnaldo Momigliano. (Dec. 1991), pp. 13–26.

Italian classical scholars
20th-century Italian historians
Jewish historians
Jewish Italian writers
1908 births
1987 deaths
MacArthur Fellows
Members of the Académie des Inscriptions et Belles-Lettres
Academics of University College London
Fellows of the British Academy
Honorary Knights Commander of the Order of the British Empire
20th-century Italian Jews
Italian refugees
Jews who immigrated to the United Kingdom to escape Nazism
Historians of ancient Rome
20th-century British historians
20th-century male writers
Academic staff of the Scuola Normale Superiore di Pisa
People from Caraglio
Presidents of The Roman Society
Members of the American Philosophical Society